is a Japanese long-distance runner. He competed in the men's marathon at the 1996 Summer Olympics.

References

1966 births
Living people
Place of birth missing (living people)
Japanese male long-distance runners
Japanese male marathon runners
Olympic male marathon runners
Olympic athletes of Japan
Athletes (track and field) at the 1996 Summer Olympics
Japan Championships in Athletics winners
20th-century Japanese people
21st-century Japanese people